Probable G-protein coupled receptor 150 is a protein that in humans is encoded by the GPR150 gene.

References

Further reading

G protein-coupled receptors